Radical 123 or radical sheep meaning "sheep" or "goat" is one of the 29 Kangxi radicals (214 radicals in total) composed of 6 strokes.

In the Kangxi Dictionary, there are 156 characters (out of 49,030) to be found under this radical.

Evolution

Derived characters

See also
Yang (surname 羊)

Literature

External links

Unihan Database - U+7F8A

123
143